KSIK may refer to:

 Sikeston Memorial Municipal Airport (ICAO code KSIK)
 KSIK-LP, a low-power radio station (95.3 FM) licensed to serve Greeley, Colorado, United States
 KRFD (FM), a radio station (100.1 FM) licensed to serve Fleming, Colorado, which held the call sign KSIK from 2012 to 2014